Emily Prince (born 1981) is an American artist based in San Francisco. Her art consists mainly of drawings which make up larger installations; these works are often site-specific and incorporate a documentation of time passing.

Personal life and education 
Prince was born in 1981 in Gold Run, California. She is married to artist Shaun O'Dell and has a son, Leon Lee Prince. She graduated from Stanford University in 2003, where she received the Raina Giese Award in Creative Painting. She completed her MFA in 2008 from University of California, Berkeley.

Career 
Prince was part of the 2007 Venice Biennale, showing a multitude of small portraits depicting soldiers killed in Afghanistan and Iraq. The piece, titled American Servicemen and Women Who Have Died in Iraq and Afghanistan (But Not Including the Wounded, Nor the Iraqis nor the Afghans), was purchased by the Saatchi Gallery and on exhibit in 2010.  As of 2010, the piece had 5,213 portraits.

Previous projects include a series of drawings cataloguing all the items in her apartment, in definitive categories.

Selected exhibitions
2009

"The Way it Used to Be", Kent Fine Art, New York

2007

1998 A Short Show About Something, Red Mill Gallery, Vermont

2006

Familiar, Eleanor Harwood Gallery, San Francisco 

Kapital, Kent Gallery, New York 

The Birthday Project, Jack Hanley Gallery, San Francisco

2005

Bay Area Now 4, Yerba Buena Center for the Arts
 
2004

The Bay Area Show, Art Institute of Detroit

The San Francisco Show, New Image Art Gallery, Los Angeles 

Around around every day, Backroom Gallery, San Francisco

See The Line Inside, Whitney Biennial (Cupcake Café), New York

References

External links 
Emily Prince on ArtFacts.net
Images, biography and texts from the Saatchi Gallery
Website for Prince’s ongoing project The American Servicemen and Women
Kent Fine Art: Emily Prince 

American artists
1981 births
Living people